Elopiprazole is an antipsychotic drug of the phenylpiperazine class which was never marketed.

See also 
 Phenylpiperazine

References 

Benzofurans
N-(2-methoxyphenyl)piperazines
Pyrroles
Fluoroarenes